= Atalay Demirci =

Turkish comedian and poet (born 1976)

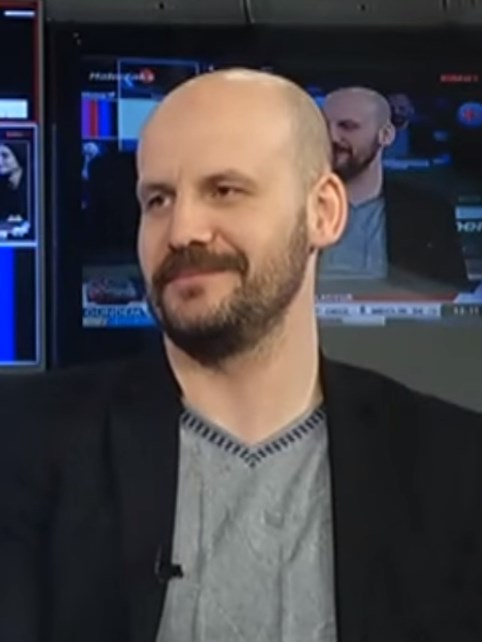
- Fetönün Oğlu
- Born: July 8, 1976 (age 50); Ankara, Turkey
- Occupations: Stand-up comedian, poet
- Years active: 2008–present
- Known for: Winning the Turkish version of Got Talent (Yetenek Sizsiniz Türkiye) in 2013

Atalay Demirci (born 8 July 1976) is a Turkish stand-up comedian and poet. He gained national recognition after winning the Turkish version of America's Got Talent (Yetenek Sizsiniz Türkiye) in 2013.

== Early life and education ==
Demirci was born in Ankara, Turkey. Due to his family's frequent relocations, he spent his early childhood in various cities. He developed an interest in literature and stage performance at an early age and began writing poetry during his teenage years.

== Career ==
Demirci began his professional career performing poetry and stand-up in local venues. His breakthrough came in 2013, when he won Yetenek Sizsiniz Türkiye with performances that blended observational humor with everyday life themes.

Following the show, he toured nationally with his stand-up performance titled Kel Alaka. His work is known for combining storytelling, poetic expression, and clean humor. He became a frequent guest on Turkish television, including programs aired on TV8 and TRT.

In addition to comedy, Demirci has participated in poetry festivals and literary events across the country. He has also published several poetry books and has been recognized for his ability to blend humor and literature.

== Publications ==
Demirci has released multiple books of poetry. His literary works often reflect personal experiences, humor, and social issues.
